Álvaro José Jiménez Soto (born 24 November 1974) is a Guatemalan former football defender. He last played for Aurora F.C. in the Guatemalan second division.

Club career
Jiménez had two spells at Guatemalan giants CSD Comunicaciones. He also played for Jalapa and had a short spell at Mictlán.

International career
Jiménez made his debut for Guatemala in a February 1999 friendly match against Ecuador and has earned a total of 25 caps, scoring no goals. He did, however, score a goal in a non-official match against a Cameroun IX in January 2002. He has never represented his country in a FIFA World Cup qualification match but played at the 2001 and 2003 UNCAF Nations Cups, as well as at the 2002 CONCACAF Gold Cup.

Jiménez's final international was an October 2006 friendly match against Honduras.

References

External links

1974 births
Living people
People from Sacatepéquez Department
Guatemalan footballers
Guatemala international footballers
2001 UNCAF Nations Cup players
2002 CONCACAF Gold Cup players
2003 UNCAF Nations Cup players
Comunicaciones F.C. players
Aurora F.C. players
Copa Centroamericana-winning players
Association football defenders